Whitney Kiera Knight (born January 9, 1993) is an American basketball player. She played college basketball for Florida Gulf Coast and later professionally, including for the Los Angeles Sparks and the San Antonio Stars.

Florida Gulf Coast statistics

Source

Career
Knight was drafted by the Los Angeles Sparks in the second round of the 2016 WNBA draft. She was cut by the Sparks in August, 2016, after appearing in seven games. On September 2, 2016, Knight was signed by the San Antonio Stars for the remainder of the season.

In September 2016, Knight signed with Spartak Moscow Region.

In February 2017, Knight was signed by the Atlanta Dream to a training camp contract. She was waived by Atlanta on May 6, prior to the season start. In July, 2017, Knight signed with Campus Promete of the Spanish Liga Femenina de Baloncesto. Due to an ankle injury and the team's general poor play, Knight was released in November in a major upheaval by the club that also included the release of Cristina Pedrals. In seven games, Knight averaged 7.4 points and 2.8 rebounds. On January 27, 2018, Knight signed with Breiðablik of the Icelandic Úrvalsdeild kvenna. In 11 games for Breiðablik, she averaged 23.9 points and 10.6 rebounds per game.

Awards, titles and accomplishments

Individual awards
Atlantic Sun Conference Player of Year  (2): 2015, 2016
Atlantic Sun Conference All-First Team (3): 2014, 2015, 2016

References

External links
WNBA stats at basketball-reference.com
Spanish statistics at competiciones.feb.es
Florida Gulf Coast profile at fgcuathletics.com
Icelandic statistics
Profile at Eurobasket.com

1993 births
Living people
American expatriate basketball people in Iceland
American expatriate basketball people in Spain
American women's basketball players
Breiðablik women's basketball players
Florida Gulf Coast Eagles women's basketball players
Guards (basketball)
Los Angeles Sparks draft picks
Los Angeles Sparks players
San Antonio Stars players
Úrvalsdeild kvenna basketball players